"Ready or Not" is a song performed by After 7, issued as the third single from the group's eponymous debut album. In 1989, the song became the first #1 R&B single for the group.  It was also the group's first top ten pop single, peaking at #7 on the Billboard Hot 100. "Ready or Not" was certified Gold by the RIAA on August 14, 1990.

Chart positions

Weekly charts

Year-end charts

Samples
R&B singer Jazmine Sullivan's song "Let It Burn" heavily resembles the rhythm of this song since her single employs the sample
San Francisco-based lo-fi and vaporwave producer RITCHRD sampled "Ready or Not" on their song "PARIS".

See also
 List of number-one R&B singles of 1990 (U.S.)

References

1989 songs
1990 singles
After 7 songs
Contemporary R&B ballads
Song recordings produced by Babyface (musician)
Songs written by Babyface (musician)
Songs written by L.A. Reid
Song recordings produced by L.A. Reid
Virgin Records singles
1980s ballads